Chainpur  is a municipality in Sankhuwasabha District in the Kosi Zone of north-eastern Nepal. It was formed by merging five villages i.e. Chainpur, Siddhakali, Siddhapokhari, Baneshwar and Kharang. The municipality was implemented on 18 May 2014. At the time of the 1991 Nepal census it had a population of 4933 people in 948 households.

Chainpur is an ancient market place of the eastern region of Nepal. It has been famous for hundreds of years for Karuwa, a special kind of water mug with pipe tap sculptured with artistic carving on exterior of it.

It used to be district headquarters of Sankhuwasabha before it was shifted to Khandbari.

Chainpur is famous for making Khukuri.

References

External links
UN map of the municipalities of Sankhuwasabha District
Community portal of Chainpur

Populated places in Sankhuwasabha District
Municipalities in Koshi Province
Nepal municipalities established in 2014
Municipalities in Sankhuwasabha District